Emamzadeh Esmail (also Romanized as Emāmzādeh Esmā‘īl) is a village in Lajran Rural District, in the Central District of Garmsar County, Semnan Province, Iran. At the 2006 census, its population was 28, in 4 families.

References 

Populated places in Garmsar County